Dendrosinus is a genus of crenulate bark beetles in the family Curculionidae. There are about 12 described species in Dendrosinus.

Species
These 12 species belong to the genus Dendrosinus:

 Dendrosinus ater Eggers, 1930a
 Dendrosinus bonnairei Reitter, 1894c
 Dendrosinus bourreriae Schwarz, 1920
 Dendrosinus globosus Chapuis, 1869
 Dendrosinus hirsutus Schedl
 Dendrosinus lima Eggers, 1930a
 Dendrosinus mexicanus Wood, 1983a
 Dendrosinus paraguayensis Eggers, 1930a
 Dendrosinus puncticollis Blandford, 1897a
 Dendrosinus syrutschcki Wichmann & H.E., 1913a
 Dendrosinus transversalis Blandford, 1897a
 Dendrosinus vittifrons Blandford, 1897a

References

Further reading

 
 
 

Scolytinae
Articles created by Qbugbot